Rose Quarter Transit Center is a light rail station in the MAX system and a TriMet bus transit center, and is located in the Rose Quarter area of Portland, Oregon, a part of the Lloyd District. It is served by the Blue, Green and Red Lines. It is currently the 7th stop eastbound on the Eastside MAX as well as the first stop after crossing the Willamette River on the Steel Bridge. Two hundred yards west of the station is the Interstate/Rose Quarter station on the MAX Yellow Line.

Originally called the Coliseum Transit Center, it was renamed Rose Quarter Transit Center in 1994. As of September 2012, the transit center is served by six TriMet bus routes.

The transit center is located at 47 NE Holladay Street where it intersects NE Wheeler Avenue; the MAX station platforms are under an Interstate 5 overpass. The station serves the Rose Quarter area, which includes the Moda Center and the Memorial Coliseum located just to the northwest.  The station has three platforms—two side platforms plus an additional island platform and track used as train storage and during special events.

The former Portland Vintage Trolley car barn is located on the north side of the platforms and connects to the tracks just to the east of the station. It has since been converted into a maintenance facility for TriMet workers. Bus service from the surrounding stops serves much of North and Northeast Portland. Because most of the platform length is under the freeway overpass and the Rose Quarter is a major transit hub, this station can be very loud after events in the Rose Quarter neighborhood.

From 2001 to 2012, the transit center was located within Fareless Square (renamed the Free Rail Zone in 2010), but the free-ride zone was discontinued in September 2012.

There is also a concessionaire building located at this station offering refreshments.

Bus lines
Along with MAX, the transit center is served by the following bus lines:
4 - Fessenden
8 - Jackson Park/NE 15th Ave
35 - Macadam/Greeley
44 - Capitol Hwy/Mocks Crest
77 - Broadway/Halsey
85 - Swan Island
C-Tran 105/105X - I-5 Express

Gallery

See also
 List of TriMet transit centers

References

External links 

Rose Quarter Transit Center – TriMet page
Oregon History Project article on North and NorthEast Portland before urban renewal

MAX Light Rail stations
MAX Blue Line
MAX Red Line
MAX Green Line
TriMet transit centers
Railway stations in the United States opened in 1986
1986 establishments in Oregon
Lloyd District, Portland, Oregon
Transportation buildings and structures in Portland, Oregon
Railway stations in Portland, Oregon
Bus stations in Portland, Oregon
Northeast Portland, Oregon